is the 10th single by Japanese singer Miho Komatsu, under Giza studio label. It released on 21 June 2000. From this work until Miho Komatsu's 6th album ~ Hanano~ there was no arrangements from Hirohito Furui. Same as on the 7th single Sayonara no Kakera, this one is released in maxi-single format. The single reached #9 in its first week and sold 55,900 copies. This is last single which reached top 10 ranks in Oricon.

Track list
All songs are written and composed by Miho Komatsu

arrangement: Daisuke Ikeda
the single was used as an ending song for the animated feature film Case Closed: Captured in Her Eyes. At present this is Miho Komatsu's last Detective Conan song.

arrangement: Yoshinobu Ohga
As <everyplace ver.> (instrumental)
arrangement: Kūron Oshiro
this is re-arrangered version song from 3rd album Miho Komatsu 3rd ~everywhere~
 (instrumental)

References 

2000 singles
2000 songs
Miho Komatsu songs
Being Inc. singles
Giza Studio singles
Case Closed songs
Japanese film songs
Songs written for animated films
Songs written by Miho Komatsu
Song recordings produced by Daiko Nagato